The White Plains Wombats are rugby league football team based in White Plains, New York. The team was established in 2016, and currently plays in the USA Rugby League. The team was founded after the Connecticut Wildcats folded, and comprised players of the Wildcats as well as the local White Plains RFC rugby union club.

2020 Squad
Dave Greiner
Jack Molloy
Dominic Ricotta
Mike Sexauer
Shak Kotishak
Rob Niedzwiecki
Zach White
Mike Schachter
Christian Artuso
Rob Stabile
Ike Etienne
Nathan Wales
Luke Barron
Julio Sanchez
Diego Carranza
Tone Rodriguez
Tony Kalamas
CJ Cortalano
George Reis
Thomas Stevenson
Matt Walsh

References

External links

2016 establishments in New York (state)
Rugby clubs established in 2016
Rugby league teams in New York (state)
Sports teams in New York (state)
USA Rugby League teams